The 1971 Michigan State Spartans football team represented Michigan State University in the 1971 Big Ten Conference football season. In their 18th season under head coach Duffy Daugherty, the Spartans compiled a 6–5 overall record (5–3 against Big Ten opponents) and finished in a tie for third place in the Big Ten Conference.

Four Spartans were selected by either the Associated Press (AP) or the United Press International (UPI) as first-team players on the 1971 All-Big Ten Conference football team: running back Eric Allen (AP-1, UPI-1); offensive guard Joe DeLamielleure (AP-1, UPI-1); defensive tackle Ron Curl (AP-1, UPI-1); and defensive back Brad Van Pelt (AP-1, UPI-1).

Schedule

Personnel
 LB No. 98 Gail Clark, Jr.

Game summaries

Michigan

On October 9, 1971, Michigan State lost Michigan, 24–13, in front of 80,093 spectators, the largest crowd to that time in the history of Spartan Stadium in East Lansing, Michigan. Billy Taylor rushed for 117 yards and two touchdowns on 15 carries. Tom Slade started his first game at quarterback, completed three of nine passes for 45 yards, and rushed for 48 yards and a touchdown. With Michigan State athletic director Biggie Munn in critical condition following a stroke, the Spartans kept the game close. Michigan State trailed 10–7 late in the third quarter and had the ball at Michigan's 14-yard line. At that point, Michigan's Butch Carpenter forced a fumble that was recovered by Mike Keller. The Wolverines then sealed the game with a two-yard touchdown run by Taylor and a seven-yard touchdown run by Slade. Michigan kicker Dana Coin converted three point after touchdown attempts and kicked a 27-yard field goal.

References

Michigan State
Michigan State Spartans football seasons
Michigan State Spartans football